This is a list of Azerbaijan football transfers in the summer transfer window, 9 June - 31 August 2016, by club. Only clubs of the 2016–17 Azerbaijan Premier League are included.

Azerbaijan Premier League 2016-17

AZAL

In:

Out:

Gabala

In:

Out:

Inter Baku

In:

Out:

Kapaz

In:

Out:

Neftchi Baku

In:

Out:

Qarabağ

In:

Out:

Sumgayit

In:

Out:

Zira 

In:

Out:

References

Azerbaijan
Azerbaijani football transfer lists